
This is a list of past and present members of the Académie des Beaux-Arts in section II: Sculpture.

Seat #1 

 elected 1795: Philippe-Laurent Roland (1746–1816)
 1816: Claude Ramey (1794–1838)
 1838: Augustin-Alexandre Dumont (1801–1884)
 1884: Louis-Ernest Barrias (1841–1905)
 1905: Denys Puech (1864–1942)
 1943: Paul Niclausse (1879–1958)
 1960: Paul Belmondo (1898–1982)
 1983: Jean Cardot (1930–2020)

Seat #2 

 1795: Jean-Antoine Houdon (1741–1828)
 1828: Étienne-Jules Ramey (1796–1852)
 1852: Bernard-Gabriel Seurre (1795–1867)
 1868: Antoine-Louis Barye (1796–1875)
 1875: Gabriel-Jules Thomas (1824–1905)
 1905: Jean-Antoine Injalbert (1845–1933)
 1933: Henri Bouchard (1875–1960)
 1961:  (1910–1992)
 1992:  (born 1930)

Seat #3 

 1795: Claude Dejoux (1731–1816)
 1816: Jacques-Philippe Le Sueur (1757–1830)
 1831: Jean-Baptiste Roman (1792–1835)
 1835: Louis-Messidor Petitot (1794–1862)
 1862: Eugène Guillaume (1822–1905)
 1905: André-Joseph Allar (1845–1926)
 1926: Paul Landowski (1875–1961)
 1962:  (1901–1980)
 1981: Nicolas Schöffer (1912–1992)
 1992: François Stahly (1911–2006)
 2013:  (born 1953)

Seat #4 
 1809: François-Frédéric Lemot (1772–1827)
 1827: Jean-Jacques Pradier (1790–1852)
 1852: Pierre-Charles Simart (1808–1857)
 1857: François Jouffroy (1806–1882)
 1882: Alexandre Falguière (1831–1900)
 1900: Jules Coutan (1848–1939)
 1939: Alexandre Descatoire (1874–1949)
 1950: Claude Grange (1883–1971)
 1973: Georges Hilbert (1900–1982)
This seat was transferred to section VII in 1985.

Seat #5 

 1810: Pierre Cartellier (1757–1831)
 1831: Charles-François Lebœuf (1792–1865)
 1865: Jean-Joseph Perraud (1819–1876)
 1876: Paul Dubois (1829–1905)
 1905: René de Saint-Marceaux (1845–1915)
 1917: Georges Gardet (1863–1939)
 1939: Félix-Alexandre Desruelles (1865–1943)
 1943: Léon-Ernest Drivier (1878–1951)
 1951:  (1884–1960)
 1961: Alfred Janniot (1889–1969)
 1970: Étienne Martin (1913–1995)
 1999: Eugène Dodeigne (1923–2015)
 2018: Jean-Michel Othoniel (born 1964)

Seat #6 

 1810: Félix Lecomte (1737–1817)
 1817: Jean-Baptiste Stouf (1743–1826)
 1826: David d'Angers (1789–1856)
 1856: Jean-Louis Jaley (1802–1866)
 1866: Jean-Marie Bonnassieux (1810–1892)
 1892: Emmanuel Frémiet (1824–1910)
 1910: Raoul Verlet (1857–1923)
 1924: François-Léon Sicard (1862–1934)
 1935: Paul Gasq (1860–1944)
 1944: Marcel Gaumont (1880–1962)
 1964:  (1911–1988)
 1990:  (1923-2018)
 2021: Anne Poirier (born 1942)

Seat #7 

 1816: François Joseph Bosio (1768–1845)
 1845: Philippe Joseph Henri Lemaire (1798–1880)
 1880: Henri Chapu (1833–1891)
 1891: Antonin Mercié (1845–1916)
 1919: Jean Dampt (1854–1945)
 1946: Lucien Brasseur (1878–1960)
 1961:  (1885–1971)
 1973: Hubert Yencesse (1900–1987)
 1989: Albert Féraud (1921–2008)
 2008:  (born 1959)

Seat #8 

 1816: Charles Dupaty (1771–1825)
 1825: Jean-Pierre Cortot (1787–1843)
 1843: Francisque Joseph Duret (1804–1865) 
 1865: Jules Cavelier (1814–1894)
 1894: Laurent Marqueste (1848–1920)
 1920: Hippolyte Lefebvre (1863–1935)
 1936: Jean Boucher (1870–1939)
 1941:  (1884–1969)
 1969: Louis Leygue (1905–1992)
 1993:  (born 1928)

Seat #9 
 2007:  (born 1943)

Sources
 List of members @ the Académie des Beaux-Arts website.

See also
List of Académie des Beaux-Arts members: Painting
List of Académie des Beaux-Arts members: Architecture
List of Académie des Beaux-Arts members: Engraving
List of Académie des Beaux-Arts members: Music
List of Académie des Beaux-Arts members: Unattached
List of Académie des Beaux-Arts members: Cinema

 Sculpture
French sculptors
Lists of French people
Lists of sculptors